Broad Water, or Broadwater (Welsh: Aber Dysynni) is a salt water lagoon near Tywyn, Wales formed from the silted up estuary of the River Dysynni. In the eighteenth and nineteenth centuries, the estuary was used by the shipbuilding industry, as small sailing ships were launched to carry peat from the local peat bogs. This industry was abandoned in the nineteenth century when the estuary became too silted up, forming the lagoon. The outflow of the lagoon flows beneath a railway bridge before entering Cardigan Bay.

The area is a haven for many wetland birds, and has been designated a Site of Special Scientific Interest.

References

Estuaries of Wales
Lagoons of Wales
Bodies of water of Gwynedd
Sites of Special Scientific Interest in West Gwynedd
Llangelynin, Gwynedd
Tywyn
Coast of Snowdonia
Coast of Gwynedd